These are the Oricon number one albums of 1994, per the Oricon Albums Chart.

Chart history

References

1994 record charts
Lists of number-one albums in Japan
1994 in Japanese music